Chota Anhik Mandir is a Hindu temple of the Puthia Temple Complex in Puthia Upazila, Rajshahi Division, Bangladesh.

Location 
Puthia town where the temple is located is accessible by road, 32 km away from Rajshahi town which is also a railhead. Rajshahi is located on the Dhaka Rajashahi Highway.

Gallery

References

Puthia Temple Complex
Archaeological sites in Rajshahi District